

Beornmod was a medieval Bishop of Rochester. He was consecrated in 804. He died between 842 and 844.

Citations

References

External links
 

Bishops of Rochester
9th-century English bishops